The Senator Walter Lowrie Shaw House is an historic home located in downtown Butler, Butler County, Pennsylvania, United States. Considered the last of its kind in the city of Butler, it is known in the area for being the home of Butler's only United States Senator, Walter Lowrie. 

Situated behind the Butler County Courthouse, it houses the Butler County Historical Society's office, and is maintained as a museum by the Society.

History and architectural features
The last house of its kind in the city of Butler, it was built in 1828, and is situated behind the Butler County Courthouse. 

It is a two-and-one-half-story, brick dwelling on a cut stone foundation, and has a slate covered gable roof. The front section measures forty-eight feet by thirty-eight feet and has a two-story, shed-roofed rear wing. 

A front porch was added between 1870 and 1880.

Present day 
The house is currently home to the Butler County Historical Society's office, and is maintained as a museum by the Society.

It was listed on the National Register of Historic Places in 1979.

References

External links 
 Butler County Historical Society
 NRHP sites for Butler County, PA

Houses completed in 1828
Houses on the National Register of Historic Places in Pennsylvania
Houses in Butler County, Pennsylvania
Museums in Butler County, Pennsylvania
Historic house museums in Pennsylvania
Butler, Pennsylvania
National Register of Historic Places in Butler County, Pennsylvania